Kępice  is a village in the administrative district of Gmina Sieciechów, within Kozienice County, Masovian Voivodeship, in east-central Poland. 

History	
Every year, on the first Sunday of November, ceremony held in connection with the feast of Polish Independence Day with escort of the Polish Army. The beginning of the ceremony begins with Mass. in the parish church in Opactwo then paid tribute to soldiers at the Opactwo cemetery and meeting at the Monument in Kępice.

See also 
Kępice

References

External links



Villages in Kozienice County